Yafi may refer to:

Yafa, tribe and region in Yemen
Abdallah El-Yafi, Lebanese politician
Yafa an-Naseriyye, town in Palestine
Jaffa (Yafi in Arabic), ancient port city in Palestine